Flour Babies is a day school novel for young adults, written by Anne Fine and published by Hamilton in 1992. It features a group "science experiment" in a classroom full of underachieving students: "When his class of underachievers is assigned to spend three torturous weeks taking care of their own "babies" in the form of bags of flour, Simon makes amazing discoveries about himself while coming to terms with his long-absent father. Many year 6 students will do this project to teach them about responsibilities. "

Fine won the annual Carnegie Medal from the Library Association, recognising the year's best children's book by a British subject. She is one of eight writers with two such honours (no one has won three), having won the 1986 Medal for Goggle-Eyes. The earlier book uses a day school frame to recount a story of family life.

Little, Brown published the first U.S. edition in 1994. The teachers were renamed and the students were moved from "class 4C" to "Room 8" for the American audience. Some libraries report the title Flour babies and the boys of Room 8.

Synopsis

The story centers around Simon Martin, a pupil in class 4C at an unnamed school.  4C is the class reserved for the school's worst students. As it so happens, a new student has arrived at the school, and, by sheer coincidence, his name is Martin Simon. The two boys are the complete antithesis of each other – Martin Simon passed all his science exams with flying colors, reads voraciously, and even speaks and reads French fluently. The class teacher, Mr. Cartright, sends the boy to Dr. Feltham's class, and Simon, who had been sent there by accident, soon arrives. The class is choosing their options for their contribution to the school Science Fair. They wish they could work on one of the most exciting experiments – The Exploding Custard Tins, Soap Factory, or Maggot Farm, for example – but these have been reserved for those who passed their science exams. As a result, 4C has ended up having to choose between a series of boring experiments.  First, they have to choose a topic – their options are consumer studies, textiles, child development, nutrition, and domestic economy.  Simon Martin is given the task of pulling a voting slip out of a tub; Martin Simon's slip comes out, and the topic he has chosen is "child development".

The experiment that Dr. Feltham (an eccentric science teacher who organizes the fair) has chosen for child development is 'Flour Babies. Each boy is given a six-pound bag of flour, in rags to form the look of a baby, and he must care for it at all times as if it were a real baby. They must also write a diary explaining how they cope with this responsibility. Needless to say, the boys are not happy with this experiment, and neither is their teacher.   But Simon misunderstands a conversation he overhears between Dr. Feltham and Mr. Cartright, and thinks that they will get to kick the flour babies to bits at the end.  Mr. Cartright decides to pick another topic, but Simon has already mistakenly informed the class about kicking the babies to bits; they like the idea and press-gang him into letting them do the experiment.  Simon becomes fond of his flour baby, while the others complain. Simon reflects on his own childhood: his Dad left home when Simon was just six weeks old, and never came back. His relationship with his mother has always been precarious, and Simon now begins to learn about the pressures of parenthood.

See also

References

External links
  —immediately, first US edition 

1992 British novels
1992 children's books
British children's novels
Carnegie Medal in Literature winning works
Novels by Anne Fine
Works about parenting
Novels set in schools
Hamish Hamilton books